Rodolfo Freude (1922–2003) was a close advisor of President Juan Perón of Argentina and served as his director of the Information Division (División de Informaciones).

Freude, an Argentine citizen of German descent, is suspected of having organized ODESSA and smuggling Nazi officers to Argentina.

See also
 Coordinación de Informaciones de Estado
 Secretaría de Inteligencia
 List of Argentine Secretaries of Intelligence
 Richard Walther Darré
 Carlos Fuldner
 Charles Lescat
 Ratlines (World War II aftermath)

References

External links

Argentine Secretaries of Intelligence
Argentine people of German descent
Place of birth missing
1922 births
2003 deaths
Argentine anti-communists
Burials at La Chacarita Cemetery